Somewhere Under Wonderland is the seventh studio album by American rock band Counting Crows, released on September 2, 2014 in the United States through Capitol Records, and on September 15, 2014 in the UK, through Virgin EMI. It is available on CD, vinyl and as a digital download. The album is the band's first album of original material in six years since 2008's Saturday Nights & Sunday Mornings.

The album marks the band's first release on Capitol Records. After parting with original label Geffen Records of 18 years in 2009, the band released two live albums and a studio album of cover songs independently. While touring in the "Outlaw Roadshow," a traveling festival show sponsored by the band in part with the music blog Ryan's Smashing Life, the band began to write new material. After recording independently, they shopped the album around to eight or nine labels and finally signed with Capitol.

Background and recording
Writing of material for the new album began early in 2013 and continued during that year's summer tour. Duritz explained in concert that "God of Ocean Tides" was the first new song he'd written in years, and was inspired by leaving Nashville on their tour bus at two in the morning.

Release

Singles
The lead single from Somewhere Under Wonderland, entitled "Palisades Park", was released on July 8, 2014. It was followed by a second single, "Scarecrow".

Critical reception

Somewhere Under Wonderland has received mostly positive feedback from music critics. At Metacritic, they assign a "weighted average" rating out of 100 to selected independent ratings and reviews from mainstream critics, and the album has received a Metascore of a 74, based on 10 reviews, indicating "generally favorable reviews."

Fred Thomas of AllMusic rates the album four stars, calling "Somewhere Under Wonderland distinctively Counting Crows. Duritz's raspy voice and lucid, lyrical stories always hold just a hint of desperation, and even decades into a staggered career, these new tunes can’t help but feel like part of a larger narrative that began during the band’s '90s glory days but finds further, greater refinement here." In a three stars review on behalf of Rolling Stone, Jon Dolan writes how "Adam Duritz is still the same dreadlocked dreamer you remember from the Nineties, channeling Van Morrison, R.E.M. and Bruce Springsteen into word-zonked ballads that reference Jackie-O., Elvis, Johnny Appleseed and more." Helen Brown of The Daily Telegraph calls the album "their best collection of songs since their debut."

Track listing

Personnel
Counting Crows
Jim Bogios – drums, percussion, harmony vocals, hand claps on "Earthquake Driver"
David Bryson – guitar, acoustic guitar, harmony vocals
Adam Duritz – lead vocals, piano, harmony vocals
Charlie Gillingham – keyboards, piano, Hammond B3 organ, Mellotron, harmony vocals
David Immerglück – guitar, pedal steel guitar, mandolin, vocals, harmony vocals
Millard Powers – bass guitar, harmony vocals
Dan Vickrey – guitar, 12-string guitar, harmony vocals

Additional musicians
Brian Deck – glockenspiel on "Palisades Park" and "God of Ocean Tides", hand claps on "Earthquake Driver", production, mixing at The Magic Shop in New York City in April 2014
Eric Hillman – backing vocals on "Cover Up the Sun"
Brian Holl – backing vocals on "Cover Up the Sun"
John Paul Roney – backing vocals
Chris Watson – trumpet on "Palisades Park"

Technical personnel
Shawn Dealey – engineering
Jason Butler – assistant engineering
Greg Calbi – mastering at Sterling Sound in New York City
Kabir Hermon – assistant engineering, engineering
Albert Hernandez – assistant engineering
Eric Hillman – vocal engineering
Felipe Molina – art conception, paintings

Chart performance
Somewhere Under Wonderland debuted at No. 6 on the Billboard 200 chart, selling 32,000 copies in its first week. It marks the band's sixth top 10 album.

In Canada, the album debuted at No. 10 on the Canadian Albums Chart, selling 1,500 copies.

Release history

References

External links

2014 albums
Counting Crows albums
Capitol Records albums
Albums produced by Brian Deck
Virgin EMI Records albums
Roots rock albums